The 7th Asian Table Tennis Championships 1984 were held in Islamabad, Pakistan, from 20 to 28 October 1984. It was organised by the Pakistan Table Tennis Federation under the authority of Asian Table Tennis Union (ATTU) and International Table Tennis Federation (ITTF).

Medal summary

Medal table

Events

See also
World Table Tennis Championships
Asian Cup

References

Asian Table Tennis Championships
Asian Table Tennis Championships
Table Tennis Championships
Table tennis competitions in Pakistan
Asian Table Tennis Championships
Asian Table Tennis Championships